The 1990 European Espoirs Wrestling Championships was the 10th edition of European Espoirs Wrestling Championships  was held 1990 in Helsinki, Finland.

Medal table

Medal summary

Men's freestyle

Men's Greco-Roman

References

External links 
 Database

Wrestling
European Espoirs Wrestling Championships
Euro